The Centre for Medieval Studies (CMS) is a research centre at the University of Toronto in Canada dedicated to the history, thought, and artistic expression of the cultures that flourished during the Middle Ages.

The centre was founded in 1964, with Bertie Wilkinson as its first director. Its foundation was announced in the journal Speculum:

The centre had originated in a Medieval Club that met at Hart House. It was inspired by the Pontifical Institute of Mediaeval Studies (PIMS), which had been founded in 1929 by Étienne Gilson. In turn, it was one of the inspirations for the University of Leeds Graduate Centre for Medieval Studies.

The Centre's logo was designed by Allan Fleming, while he was head of graphic design at University of Toronto Press, from 1968–1976.

The Centre is now located in the Lillian Massey Building, part of Victoria University, Toronto.

References 

University of Toronto
Medieval studies research institutes
Educational institutions established in 1964
Research institutes in Canada
1964 establishments in Ontario